Abu Ibrahim Sajeel Shahid is a man who was one of the leaders of Al-Muhajiroun, an Islamist group based in the United Kingdom that endorsed al Qaeda's terror attacks on 11 September 2001. He was called the Emir or Lahore Emir and was the head of Al-Muhajiroun in Pakistan.

On 1 December 2001, an interview with Shahid was published in the Manchester Evening News, in which he described fellow young men from the Manchester area travelling to Pakistan to fight beside the Taliban.

In 2005, it was reported that Shahid had run a "safe house" in Lahore for violent extremists from the United Kingdom. The Pakistani government abducted and held Shahid in 2005 at an undisclosed location without access to the justice system for three-month before expelling him. PTI chief Imran Khan called Shahid's abduction and detention a gross human rights violation.

During the 2007 trial of individuals suspected of involvement in the Luton cell's bomb plot the BBC reported that the training camp in Pakistan where Mohammed Quayyam Khan and Omar Khyam received bomb-making training had been allegedly set up by Shahid, and that Mohammed Siddique Khan was also suspected of involvement in training at a camp set up by Shahid.

Shahid has a degree in computer science from Manchester University.

References

Living people
British computer scientists
Alumni of the University of Manchester
English people of Pakistani descent
Year of birth missing (living people)